Emil Grøndal (born 27 May 1995) is a former speedway rider from Denmark. He medalled three times at the Team Speedway Junior European Championship.

Career
Grøndal reached the final of the 2015 Speedway Under-21 World Championship. He also began his British speedway career riding for Peterborough Panthers in 2015. In 2016, he remained with Peterborough for the 2016 Premier League speedway season.

He rode in the top tier of British Speedway riding for the Swindon Robins in the SGB Premiership 2017 before returning to Peterborough for the SGB Championship 2018.

He announced his retirement from speedway in November 2020.

References 

1995 births
Living people
Danish speedway riders
Peterborough Panthers riders
Swindon Robins riders
People from Silkeborg
Sportspeople from the Central Denmark Region